Zadov (sometimes transliterated as Zadoff) is a Russian-language surname. It may refer to:

 Lev Zadov, Ukrainian counter-intelligence agent
 Allen Zadoff, American author of young adult fiction
 Solomon A. Zadoff, mathematician, a namesake of the Zadoff–Chu sequence

Russian-language surnames
Jewish surnames